Ramez Movie Star is a television hidden camera–pranks show presented by Ramez Galal and Jean-Claude Van Damme. The programme was aired in Ramadan 2022 by MBC Group. It is sponsored by the General Entertainment Authority of Saudi Arabia.

Plot 

The show was shot in Riyadh desert, Saudi Arabia. In the middle of the desert, and in Mad Max: Fury Road (2015) setting, with elements of excitement, suspense and fear. The guest arrives to the show being told that there was a movie in which Jean-Claude Van Damme was starring. Consequently, the guest of the episode assumes that he was chosen to perform one of the scenes.

First of, the guest is interviewed. The show's guest then meets Van Damme to discuss the upcoming scene. The prank starts when the guest gets to the car, which is a convertible Chevrolet Camaro ZL1. The guest is then faced with maniacal high speed, shocking stunts, and a snake priorly planted in the car. Finally, the car stops immediately before it tips into a crocodile infested lake.

The ZL1 convertible Chevrolet is considered to be the fastest Chevrolet convertible ever. Its engine power is equivalent to 580 horsepower.

Episodes guests 
This is a list of show guests sorted by date:

References 

Hidden camera television series
Egyptian television shows